Cherronesos, also Chersonesos (Χερσόνησος), was a town of ancient Caria. It was a member of the Delian League since it appears in tribute records of Athens between 452/1 and 429/8 BCE, paying a phoros of two to three talents. It is also mentioned in a tribute decree of Athens dated to 425/4 BCE. Coins are preserved that have been dated around 500 BCE, bearing the legend «ΧΕΡ»., which are attributed to Cherronesos.

Its site is unlocated.

References

Populated places in ancient Caria
Former populated places in Turkey
Lost ancient cities and towns
Greek city-states
Members of the Delian League